MQK or mqk may refer to:

 MQK, the IATA code for San Matías Airport, Bolivia
 mqk, the ISO 639-3 code for Rajah Kabunsuwan language, Philippines